Afterthoughts (occasionally stylized as After Thoughts) was a chain of accessory and jewelry stores in the United States, from the 1980s to 2002.

History

Woolworth's/Venator Group 
Then stylized as After Thoughts, the chain was first created as one of the many specialty store subsidiaries of F. W. Woolworth Company (later Venator Group), in the 1980s. By 1996, the chain had grown to a total of 809 stores, and grew further that year with the Venator Group's merger of 109 Accessory Lady stores, previously bought from Melville Corporation in 1993, into their various formats, including Afterthoughts.

Claire's Stores, Inc. 
The chain, then reduced to 768 stores, was acquired by major competitor Claire's in late 1999, as the Venator Group began selling off or closing many of its specialty store chains to focus on Champs Sporting Goods and Foot Locker. As stated in their 2000 annual report, Claire's at the time planned to convert their stores under The Icing name to Afterthoughts, as they targeted the same market, and Afterthoughts had higher sales and margins at the time. In first-quarter 2000, Claire's announced that they were closing a total of 300 stores- 100 Claire's, and 200 Afterthoughts, in malls that could not support multiple stores. Despite previously announced plans, by February 2, 2002, the Afterthoughts brand had been consolidated into Claire's existing The Icing brand, following a tumultuous 2001 fiscal year.

References 

Jewelry retailers of the United States
Retail companies disestablished in 2002
F. W. Woolworth Company